Crnogorka (Црногорка) is a Macedonian oro from the Skopje region.

It is a vivid mixed man and woman dance with quick and small steps on half feet and lot of jumps. The dancers are holding hands and begin their dance in a position of a half circle.

See also
Music of North Macedonia

Further reading
Dimovski, Mihailo. (1977:62-6). Macedonian folk dances (Original in Macedonian: Македонски народни ора). Skopje: Naša kniga & Institut za folklor

External links
An audio sample of Crnogorka played on gajda.

Macedonian dances